Gaudenzi is an Italian surname. Notable people with the surname include:

Andrea Gaudenzi (born 1973), Italian tennis player
Gianluca Gaudenzi (born 1965), Italian footballer and manager
Jochen Gaudenzi (born 1978), Austrian footballer and manager
Pietro Gaudenzi (1880–1955), Italian painter
Pietro Gaudenzi (bishop) (died 1664), Roman Catholic bishop
Stefano Gaudenzi (born 1941), Italian tennis player

Italian-language surnames